Tal is a town and a nagar parishad in Ratlam District of the Indian state of Madhya Pradesh. Raja Tariya Bhil established Tal in 1243 AD.

It is a tehsil of Ratlam district and situated near Chambal river. Before Indian independence, Tal was part of the princely state of Jaora.

Etymology
The name of the town is derived from the King Tariya Bhil and another reason from Malvi word Talav that means pond. The town is popularly believed to be built by reclaiming land from a large pond.

Geography
It has an average elevation of 437 metres (1,433 feet).

Demographics
 India census, Tal had a population of 14,913. Males constitute 51% of the population and females 49%. Tal has an average literacy rate of 58%, lower than the national average of 59.5%: male literacy is 67%, and female literacy is 48%. In Tal, 17% of the population is under 6 years of age.

History 
Tal was part of the princely state of Jaora, ruled by the Dodiya chief. The princely state was ruled by the Dodia clan which holds the title "Rawat". Before independence the rule was under Rawat Shri Shambhu Singh ji(Tal).

References

Cities and towns in Ratlam district
Ratlam